The 2022–23 Liga I is the 33nd season of the top level women's football league of the Romanian football league system. 12 teams will play a one legged-round robin. The top 6 teams progress then to the play-offs, while the bottom 6 teams to the play-out, where a two-legged round-robin will take place. Teams ranked 11 and 12 (5 and 6 in the play-out) will relegate directly to the 2023–24 Liga II.

U Olimpia Cluj are the defending champions.

Team changes

To Liga I
Promoted from Liga II
 Csíkszereda Miercurea Ciuc (winner of 2021–22 Liga II, Seria I)
 Carmen București (runner-up of 2021–22 Liga II, Seria II)

From Liga I
Relegated to Liga II
 CSȘ Târgoviște (12th place in 2021–22 Liga I)

Dsibanded
 Heniu Prundu Bârgăului (2nd place in 2021–22 Liga I)

Renamed teams
While still technically having remained a separate club for the duration of the 2021-22 season, and  after using the Politehnica brand for one season, ACS Fortuna Becicherecu Mic was finally dissafiliated and the cession of participation rights in all women's football competitions to the SSU Politehnica Timișoara club was approved on 5 August 2022, finalizing a deal long in the making.

Excluded and spared teams
In the summer of 2022, Heniu Prundu Bârgăului was supposed to be taken over by the CS Gloria 2018 Bistrița-Năsăud club, which had more financial support. The move fell short due to identity issues, the main reason being the Heniu brand would have been suppressed in favor of the Gloria one. Heniu coach Călin Svoboda, along with a large part of the players opted to move to found the women's football section of Gloria 2018, while Heniu disbanded due to a combination of lack of players and financial support. As a consequence, the 11th place in the 2021-22 Liga I, Universitatea Galați was spared from relegation.

Stadiums by capacity and location

References

Rom
Fem
Romanian Superliga (women's football) seasons